The NÖ Open is a men's professional golf tournament held in Austria; currently played on the Pro Golf Tour. It was founded in 2001 as an event on the third tier Alps Tour, before moving up to the second tier Challenge Tour in 2006, replacing the Austrian Open, which had been promoted to the full European Tour schedule. It was always held at Golf Club Adamstal in Ramsau.

Winners

Notes

External links
Official site (in German)
Coverage on the Challenge Tour's official site
Coverage on the Alps Tour's official site

Former Challenge Tour events
Golf tournaments in Austria
Recurring sporting events established in 2004
2004 establishments in Austria